UnityPoint Meriter Hospital (Formerly Meriter Hospital) is a nonprofit hospital in Madison, Wisconsin, United States. It is operated by UnityPoint Health.

A teaching hospital of the University of Wisconsin–Madison, it has 448 beds. The hospital, the fifth largest in the state, serves southern Wisconsin and northwestern Illinois.

On Wednesday October 9, 2013, the board of Meriter Health Services voted to join UnityPoint Health. The Meriter hospital will have a governing board that allows it to retain some autonomy.

The Madison Japanese Language School (マディソン日本語補習校 Madison Nihongo Hoshūkō), a Japanese weekend supplementary school, holds its classes at McConnel Hall of the hospital.

Physicians Plus, a regional health insurer, is owned by Meriter.

References

 Birringer, Clyde. "Succinylcholine in the Critically Ill Patient: When Is It Not OK+?" (Chapter 5). In: Canaday, Bruce Robert. ASHP's Clinical Pearls. American Society of Health-System Pharmacists (ASHP), 2008. , 9781585282180.

External links
 Meriter Hospital – University of Wisconsin School of Medicine and Public Health Department of Obstetrics and Gynecology.

Buildings and structures in Madison, Wisconsin
Hospitals in Wisconsin
University of Wisconsin–Madison
UnityPoint Health
Hospitals established in 1927